The 10th United States Congress was a meeting of the legislative branch of the United States federal government, consisting of the Senate and the House of Representatives. It met in Washington, D.C. from March 4, 1807, to March 4, 1809, during the seventh and eighth years of Thomas Jefferson's presidency. The apportionment of seats in the House of Representatives was based on the 1800 census; both chambers had an overwhelming Democratic-Republican majority.

Major events

May 22, 1807: Former Vice President of the United States Aaron Burr was indicted for treason.  He was acquitted September 1, 1807
 August 17, 1807: The Clermont, Robert Fulton's first American steamboat, left New York City for Albany, New York, on the Hudson River, inaugurating the first commercial steamboat service in the world.
January 1, 1808: The importation of slaves into the United States was banned

Major legislation

December 22, 1807: Embargo Act of 1807, ch. 5, 
March 1, 1809: Non-Intercourse Act (1809), ch. 24,

Territories organized 
February 3, 1809: Illinois Territory was organized from a portion of Indiana Territory,

Party summary
The count below identifies party affiliations at the beginning of the first session of this Congress. Changes resulting from subsequent replacements are shown below in the "Changes in membership" section.

Senate

House of Representatives

Leadership

Senate 
President: George Clinton (DR)
President pro tempore: Samuel Smith (DR), elected April 16, 1808
 Stephen R. Bradley (DR), elected December 28, 1808
 John Milledge (DR), elected January 30, 1809

House of Representatives 
Speaker: Joseph Bradley Varnum (DR)

Members
This list is arranged by chamber, then by state. Senators are listed in order of seniority, and representatives are listed by district.
Skip to House of Representatives, below

Senate
Senators were elected by the state legislatures every two years, with one-third beginning new six-year terms with each Congress. Preceding the names in the list below are Senate class numbers, which indicate the cycle of their election.

Connecticut 
 1. James Hillhouse (F)
 3. Uriah Tracy (F), died July 19, 1807
 Chauncey Goodrich (F), from October 25, 1807

Delaware 
 1. Samuel White (F)
 2. James A. Bayard (F)

Georgia 
 2. Abraham Baldwin (DR), until March 4, 1807
 George Jones (DR), August 27, 1807 – November 7, 1807
 William H. Crawford (DR), from November 7, 1807
 3. John Milledge (DR)

Kentucky 
 2. Buckner Thruston (DR)
 3. John Pope (DR)

Maryland 
 1. Samuel Smith (DR)
 3. Philip Reed (DR)

Massachusetts 
 2. Timothy Pickering (F)
 1. John Quincy Adams (F), until June 8, 1808
 James Lloyd (F), from June 9, 1808

New Hampshire 
 2. Nicholas Gilman (DR)
 3. Nahum Parker (DR)

New Jersey 
 1. John Condit (DR)
 2. Aaron Kitchell (DR)

New York 
 3. John Smith (DR)
 1. Samuel L. Mitchill (DR)

North Carolina 
 2. James Turner (DR)
 3. Jesse Franklin (DR)

Ohio 
 1. John Smith (DR), until April 25, 1808
 Return J. Meigs Jr. (DR), from December 12, 1808
 3. Edward Tiffin (DR)

Pennsylvania 
 1. Samuel Maclay (DR), until January 4, 1809
 Michael Leib (DR), from January 9, 1809
 3. Andrew Gregg (DR)

Rhode Island 
 1. Benjamin Howland (DR)
 2. James Fenner (DR), until September 1807
 Elisha Mathewson (DR), from October 26, 1807

South Carolina 
 2. Thomas Sumter (DR)
 3. John Gaillard (DR)

Tennessee 
 1. Joseph Anderson (DR)
 2. Daniel Smith (DR)

Vermont 
 3. Stephen R. Bradley (DR)
 1. Israel Smith (DR), until October 1, 1807
 Jonathan Robinson (DR), from October 10, 1807

Virginia 
 2. William B. Giles (DR)
 1. Andrew Moore (DR)

House of Representatives
The names of members of the House of Representatives are preceded by their district numbers.

Connecticut 
All representatives were elected statewide on a general ticket.(7 Federalists)
 . Epaphroditus Champion (F)
 . Samuel W. Dana (F)
 . John Davenport (F)
 . Jonathan O. Moseley (F)
 . Timothy Pitkin (F)
 . Lewis B. Sturges (F)
 . Benjamin Tallmadge (F)

Delaware 
(1 Federalist)
 . Nicholas Van Dyke (F), from October 6, 1807

Georgia 
(4 Democratic-Republicans)
 . William W. Bibb (DR)
 . Howell Cobb (DR)
 . Dennis Smelt (DR)
 . George M. Troup (DR)

Kentucky 
(6 Democratic-Republicans)
 . Matthew Lyon (DR)
 . John Boyle (DR)
 . John Rowan (DR)
 . Richard M. Johnson (DR)
 . Benjamin Howard (DR)
 . Joseph Desha (DR)

Maryland 
The 5th district was a plural district with two representatives.(6-3 Democratic-Republican)
 . John Campbell (F)
 . Archibald Van Horne (DR)
 . Philip B. Key (F)
 . Roger Nelson (DR)
 . William McCreery (DR)
 . Nicholas R. Moore (DR)
 . John Montgomery (DR)
 . Edward Lloyd (DR)
 . Charles Goldsborough (F)

Massachusetts 
(11-6 Democratic-Republican)
 . Josiah Quincy (F)
 . Jacob Crowninshield (DR), until April 15, 1808
 Joseph Story (DR), from May 23, 1808
 . Edward St. Loe Livermore (F)
 . Joseph Bradley Varnum (DR)
 . William Ely (F)
 . Samuel Taggart (F)
 . Joseph Barker (DR)
 . Isaiah L. Green (DR)
 . Josiah Dean (DR)
 . Jabez Upham (F)
 . William Stedman (F)
 . Barnabas Bidwell (DR), until July 13, 1807
 Ezekiel Bacon (DR), from September 16, 1807
 . Ebenezer Seaver (DR)
 . Richard Cutts (DR)
 . Daniel Ilsley (DR)
 . Orchard Cook (DR)
 . John Chandler (DR)

New Hampshire 
All representatives were elected statewide on a general ticket.(5 Democratic-Republicans)
 . Peter Carleton (DR)
 . Daniel M. Durell (DR)
 . Francis Gardner (DR)
 . Jedediah K. Smith (DR)
 . Clement Storer (DR)

New Jersey 
All representatives were elected statewide on a general ticket.(6 Democratic-Republicans)
 . Ezra Darby (DR), until January 27, 1808
 Adam Boyd (DR), from March 8, 1808
 . William Helms (DR)
 . John Lambert (DR)
 . Thomas Newbold (DR)
 . James Sloan (DR)
 . Henry Southard (DR)

New York 
(15-2 Democratic-Republican)
 . Samuel Riker (DR)
Joint district with two seats: Gurdon S. Mumford (DR)
Joint district with two seats: George Clinton Jr. (DR)
 . Philip Van Cortlandt (DR)
 . John Blake Jr. (DR)
 . Daniel C. Verplanck (DR)
 . Barent Gardenier (F)
 . James I. Van Alen (DR)
 . Killian K. Van Rensselaer (F)
 . Josiah Masters (DR)
 . John Thompson (DR)
 . David Thomas (DR), until February 17, 1808
 Nathan Wilson (DR), from November 7, 1808
 . Peter Swart (DR)
 . John Russell (DR)
 . William Kirkpatrick (DR)
 . Reuben Humphrey (DR)
 . John Harris (DR)

North Carolina 
(11-1 Democratic-Republicans)
 . Lemuel Sawyer (DR)
 . Willis Alston (DR)
 . Thomas Blount (DR)
 . William Blackledge (DR)
 . Thomas Kenan (DR)
 . Nathaniel Macon (DR)
 . John Culpepper (F), until January 2, 1808, and then from February 23, 1808
 . Richard Stanford (DR)
 . Marmaduke Williams (DR)
 . Evan S. Alexander (DR)
 . James Holland (DR)
 . Meshack Franklin (DR)

Ohio 
(1 Democratic-Republican)
 . Jeremiah Morrow (DR)

Pennsylvania 
There were four plural districts, the 1st, 2nd, & 3rd had three representatives each, the 4th had two representatives.(15-3 Democratic-Republican)
 . Joseph Clay (DR), until March 28, 1808
 Benjamin Say (DR), from November 16, 1808
 . John Porter (DR)
 . Jacob Richards (DR)
 . Robert Brown (DR)
 . William Milnor (F)
 . John Pugh (DR)
 . John Hiester (DR)
 . Robert Jenkins (F)
 . Matthias Richards (DR)
 . David Bard (DR)
 . Robert Whitehill (DR)
 . Daniel Montgomery Jr. (DR)
 . James Kelly (F)
 . John Rea (DR)
 . William Findley (DR)
 . John Smilie (DR)
 . William Hoge (DR)
 . Samuel Smith (DR)

Rhode Island 
Both representatives were elected statewide on a general ticket.(2 Democratic-Republicans)
 . Nehemiah Knight (DR), until June 13, 1808
 Richard Jackson Jr. (F), from November 11, 1808
 . Isaac Wilbour (DR)

South Carolina 
(8 Democratic-Republicans)
 . Robert Marion (DR)
 . William Butler Sr. (DR)
 . David R. Williams (DR)
 . John Taylor (DR)
 . Richard Winn (DR)
 . Joseph Calhoun (DR), from June 2, 1807
 . Thomas Moore (DR)
 . Lemuel J. Alston (DR)

Tennessee 
(3 Democratic-Republicans)
 . John Rhea (DR)
 . George W. Campbell (DR)
 . Jesse Wharton (DR)

Vermont 
(2-2 Democratic-Republican)
 . James Witherell (DR), until May 1, 1808
 Samuel Shaw (DR), from September 6, 1808
 . James Elliott (F)
 . James Fisk (DR)
 . Martin Chittenden (F)

Virginia 
(21-1 Democratic-Republican)
 . John G. Jackson (DR)
 . John Morrow (DR)
 . John Smith (DR)
 . David Holmes (DR)
 . Alexander Wilson (DR)
 . Abram Trigg (DR)
 . Joseph Lewis Jr. (F)
 . Walter Jones (DR)
 . John Love (DR)
 . John Dawson (DR)
 . James M. Garnett (DR)
 . Burwell Bassett (DR)
 . William A. Burwell (DR)
 . Matthew Clay (DR)
 . John Randolph (DR)
 . John W. Eppes (DR)
 . John Claiborne (DR), until October 9, 1808
 Thomas Gholson Jr. (DR), from November 7, 1808
 . Peterson Goodwyn (DR)
 . Edwin Gray (DR)
 . Thomas Newton Jr. (DR)
 . Wilson C. Nicholas (DR)
 . John Clopton (DR)

Non-voting members 
(no representation)
 . Benjamin Parke, until March 1, 1808
 Jesse B. Thomas, from October 22, 1808
 . George Poindexter
 . Daniel Clark

Changes in membership
The count below reflects changes from the beginning of the first session of this Congress.

Senate 
There were 5 resignations, 2 deaths, and 1 interim appointment.  Neither party had a net change.

|-
| Georgia(2)
|  | Abraham Baldwin (DR)
| style="font-size:80%" | Died March 4, 1807.Temporary successor appointed August 27, 1807, to continue the term.
|  | George Jones (DR)
| August 27, 1807

|-
| Connecticut(3)
|  | Uriah Tracy (F)
| style="font-size:80%" | Died July 19, 1807.Successor elected October 25, 1807, to finish the term.
|  | Chauncey Goodrich (F)
| October 25, 1807

|-
| Rhode Island(2)
|  | James Fenner (DR)
| style="font-size:80%" | Resigned September, 1807 to become Governor of Rhode Island.Successor elected to finish the term.
|  | Elisha Mathewson (DR)
| October 26, 1807

|-
| Vermont(1)
|  | Israel Smith (DR)
| style="font-size:80%" | Resigned October 1, 1807, to become Governor of Vermont.Successor elected to finish the term.
|  | Jonathan Robinson (DR)
| October 10, 1807

|-
| Georgia(2)
|  | George Jones (DR)
| style="font-size:80%" | Successor elected November 7, 1807, to finish the term, in place of a temporary appointee.
|  | William H. Crawford (DR)
| November 7, 1807

|-
| Ohio(1)
|  | John Smith (DR)
| style="font-size:80%" | Resigned April 25, 1808.Successor appointed to finish the term ending March 4, 1809.
|  | Return J. Meigs Jr. (DR)
| December 12, 1808

|-
| Massachusetts(1)
|  | John Quincy Adams (F)
| style="font-size:80%" | Resigned June 8, 1808, having broken with his party and lost re-election to the next term.Winner elected to finish the term, having already won election to the next term.
|  | James Lloyd (F)
| June 9, 1808

|-
| Pennsylvania(1)
|  | Samuel Maclay (DR)
| style="font-size:80%" | Resigned January 4, 1809, believing he would lose re-election.Winner was elected to finish the term, having already won election to the next term.
|  | Michael Leib (DR)
| January 9, 1809

|}

House of Representatives 
Of the voting members, there were 4 resignations, 4 deaths, and 2 vacancies from the beginning of this Congress.  Democratic-Republicans had no net change and Federalists picked up 2 seats.

|-
| 
| Vacant
| style="font-size:80%" | Levi Casey (DR) died before the end of the preceding Congress 
|  | Joseph Calhoun (DR)
| Seated June 2, 1807
|-
| 
| Vacant
| style="font-size:80%" | James M. Broom (F) resigned before the beginning of this Congress 
|  | Nicholas Van Dyke (F)
| Seated October 6, 1807
|-
| 
|  | Barnabas Bidwell (DR)
| style="font-size:80%" | Resigned July 13, 1807, after becoming attorney General of Massachusetts
|  | Ezekiel Bacon (DR)
| Seated September 16, 1807
|-
| 
|  | John Culpepper (F) 
| style="font-size:80%" | Seat declared vacant January 2, 1808
|  | John Culpepper (F)
| Seated February 23, 1808
|-
| 
|  | Ezra Darby (DR)
| style="font-size:80%" | Died January 27, 1808
|  | Adam Boyd (DR)
| Seated March 8, 1808
|-
| 
| Benjamin Parke
| style="font-size:80%" | Resigned March 1, 1808
| Jesse B. Thomas
| October 22, 1808
|-
| 
|  | Joseph Clay (DR)
| style="font-size:80%" | Resigned March 28, 1808 
|  | Benjamin Say (DR)
| Seated November 16, 1808
|-
| 
|  | Jacob Crowninshield (DR)
| style="font-size:80%" | Died April 15, 1808
|  | Joseph Story (DR)
| Seated May 23, 1808
|-
| 
|  | David Thomas (DR)
| style="font-size:80%" | Resigned May 1, 1808, after becoming New York State Treasurer
|  | Nathan Wilson (DR)
| November 7, 1808
|-
| 
|  | James Witherell (DR)
| style="font-size:80%" | Resigned May 1, 1808, after becoming judge of Supreme Court for Michigan Territory
|  | Samuel Shaw (DR)
| Seated September 6, 1808
|-
| 
|  | Nehemiah Knight (DR)
| style="font-size:80%" | Died June 13, 1808 
|  | Richard Jackson Jr. (F)
| Seated November 11, 1808
|-
| 
|  | John Claiborne (DR)
| style="font-size:80%" | Died October 9, 1808
|  | Thomas Gholson Jr. (DR)
| Seated November 7, 1808
|}

Committees
Lists of committees and their party leaders.

Senate

 Audit and Control the Contingent Expenses of the Senate (Chairman: John Quincy Adams)
 Engrossed Bills (Chairman: Andrew Gregg then Francis Malbone)
 Whole

House of Representatives

 Accounts (Chairman: Nicholas R. Moore)
 Affairs with Algiers (Select) 
 Claims (Chairman: David Holmes)
 Commerce and Manufactures (Chairman: Thomas Newton Jr.)
 Conduct of Peter J. Bruin (Select) 
 District of Columbia (Chairman: Joseph Lewis Jr.)
 Elections (Chairman: William Findley)
 Post Office and Post Roads (Chairman: John Rhea)
 Public Lands (Chairman: John Boyle then Jeremiah Morrow)
 Revisal and Unfinished Business (Chairman: John Clopton)
 Rules (Select) 
 Standards of Official Conduct 
 Ways and Means (Chairman: George W. Campbell) 
 Whole

Joint committees

 Enrolled Bills (Chairman: Sen. James Turner)
 The Library (Chairman: N/A)

Employees

Legislative branch agency directors 
Architect of the Capitol: Benjamin Latrobe
Librarian of Congress: Patrick Magruder

Senate 
Chaplain: John J. Sayrs (Episcopalian), until November 10, 1807
 Alexander T. McCormick (Episcopalian), elected November 10, 1807
 Robert Elliott (Presbyterian), elected November 10, 1808
Secretary: Samuel A. Otis
Sergeant at Arms: James Mathers

House of Representatives 
Chaplain: Robert Elliott Presbyterian, until October 30, 1807
 Obadiah B. Brown, Baptist, from October 30, 1807
Clerk: John J. Beckley, until April 8, 1807 (died)
 Patrick Magruder, from April 8, 1807
Doorkeeper: Thomas Claxton
Reading Clerks: 
Sergeant at Arms: Joseph Wheaton, until October 27, 1807
 Thomas Dunn, from October 27, 1807

See also 
 1806 United States elections (elections leading to this Congress)
 1806–07 United States Senate elections
 1806–07 United States House of Representatives elections
 1808 United States elections (elections during this Congress, leading to the next Congress)
 1808 United States presidential election
 1808–09 United States Senate elections
 1808–09 United States House of Representatives elections

Notes

References

External links
Statutes at Large, 1789-1875 
Senate Journal, First Forty-three Sessions of Congress
House Journal, First Forty-three Sessions of Congress
Biographical Directory of the U.S. Congress 
U.S. House of Representatives: House History 
U.S. Senate: Statistics and Lists